Tarzan: Lord of the Jungle is a 1994 video game for the Game Boy and Game Gear video game systems.

Gameplay
The player controls Tarzan (based on the famous character created by Edgar Rice Burroughs for his novel Tarzan of the Apes) in six different missions set in Africa.
These include curing the Great Ape's disease and saving his friends from the evil poachers. These poachers want to capture the wildlife and place them in their zoos. Weapons that can be utilized include: spears, knives, and arrows. Pitfalls and obstacles are to be avoided in order to collect the mandatory quest item. Under a strict time limit, players can swing on vines and swim vast bodies of water to cross various parts of stages.

Development
The game was announced for the Super NES console, as well as the Game Boy and Game Gear handhelds. The Super NES version was being developed by Manley & Associates, however it was cancelled before release; a prototype ROM was found in October 2019.

Reception
Reviewing the Game Boy version, GamePro commented that Tarzan: Lord of the Jungle "demands way too much patient replaying for the average fun it offers." They elaborated that inaccurate controls often fail the player when jumping through trees, forcing frequent backtracking, and that the lack of passwords means the player must navigate through the same mazes multiple times. Electronic Gaming Monthly gave it a 5.4 out of 10, commenting that "The many icons and challenging bosses make the trip worthwhile, but this is pretty much standard stuff with elements every action fan will recognize."

References

External links

1994 video games
Game Boy games
GameTek games
Game Gear games
Platform games
Video games developed in the United Kingdom
Video games set in Africa
Works based on Tarzan
Eurocom games
Single-player video games